The 1989 Citizen Cup was a tennis tournament played on outdoor clay courts at the Am Rothenbaum in Hamburg in West Germany that was part of the Category 3 tier of the 1989 WTA Tour. It was the 12th edition of the edition of the tournament and was held from 1 May until 7 May 1989. First-seeded Steffi Graf won the singles title, her third consecutive at the event. Both the singles and doubles finals were cancelled after Jana Novotná was forced to default as a result of an injury to her right ankle which she sustained during her singles semifinal match against Arantxa Sánchez Vicario.

Finals

Singles

 Steffi Graf defeated  Jana Novotná by walkover
 It was Graf's 6th singles title of the year and the 36th of her career.

Doubles

 Isabelle Demongeot /  Nathalie Tauziat defeated  Jana Novotná /  Helena Suková by walkover
 It was Demongeot's only title of the year and the 4th of her career. It was Tauziat's only title of the year and the 4th of her career.

References

External links
 ITF tournament edition details
 Tournament draws

Citizen Cup
WTA Hamburg
1989 in West German women's sport
1989 in German tennis